Optimus may refer to:

Organisations
 Optimus Telecomunicações, S.A., a Portuguese mobile phone company who was merged with ZON and formed a new company called NOS
 Optimus S.A., a former Polish computer assembler

Fictional characters 
Optimus Prime, a Transformers character, leader of the Autobots
 Optimus Primal, a Transformer character, leader of the Maximals

Music
 Optimus Rhyme, a trio of nerdcore rap artists
 Optimus (album), an album by guitarist John Norum

Technology
 LG Optimus, a series of smartphones by LG Electronics
 Nvidia Optimus, a technology which saves laptop battery life by switching between two graphics adapters
 Optimus UI, a front-end touch interface developed by LG Electronics with partners
 Optimus Maximus keyboard, a keyboard with displays in each key
 Optimus brand, a proprietary RadioShack brand of electronic products
 Optimus platform, a process integration and design optimization software by Noesis Solutions
 Tesla Bot, also known as Optimus, a concept robot proposed by Tesla, Inc.

See also
 Jupiter (mythology), or Jupiter Optimus Maximus, a deity in Roman mythology
 Jupiter Optimus Maximus, a temple honoring Jupiter